Pelikan Łowicz is a Polish football club based in Łowicz, Poland.

External links
Official website 

 Club Site 

Association football clubs established in 1945
1945 establishments in Poland
Łowicz County
Football clubs in Łódź Voivodeship